This page is a list of New Zealand scientists with articles on Wikipedia and is necessarily incomplete.

 Helen Anderson – seismonologist, public servant
 Alexander Aitken – mathematician/statistician, writer, mental calculator, musician
 
 Sir Brian Barratt-Boyes – heart surgeon
 Peter Barrett – geologist, Antarctic researcher
 Jacqueline Beggs (born 1962) – New Zealand entomologist and ecologist
 Patricia Bergquist – zoologist, anatomist
 Nancy Bertler – Antarctic researcher
 Rod Bieleski – plant physiologist
 Gary Bold – physicist 
 Helen Bostock – paleoceanographer
 Warwick Bowen – experimental physicist
 Margaret Bradshaw – Antarctic researcher, palaeontologist
 Margaret Brimble – chemist
 Alexandra Brewis Slade – anthropologist
 Bob Brockie – artist, ecologist
 John C. Butcher – mathematician
 Walter Buller – naturalist
 Carolyn Burns – freshwater ecologist
 Sir Paul Callaghan – famous for work in magnetic resonance
 Howard Carmichael – theoretical physicist doing quantum optics
 Garth Carnaby – physicist
Janet Carter – professor and Dean of Science at the University of Canterbury
 Amy Castle – entomologist
 Ann Chapman – limnologist
 Thomas Frederic Cheeseman – botanist, naturalist
 Charles Chilton – zoologist
 Helen Shearburn Clark (Rotman) – marine zoologist 
 John G. Cleary – computer scientist
 Leonard Cockayne – botanist
 Leslie Comrie – computer pioneer
 Lucy Cranwell – botanist
 G. H. Cunningham – "father" of New Zealand mycology
 Kathleen Curtis – mycologist, plant pathologist, first female fellow of the Royal Society of New Zealand
 Michelle Dickinson – nanotechnologist
 Joan Dingley – mycologist
 John Newton Dodd – optical physicist
 Richard Dowden – radio and space physicist
 Peter David Drummond – quantum optics specialist
 Doug Dye – plant bacteriologist
 Sir Richard Faull – neuroscientist
 Charles Fleming – ornithologist, palaeontologist
 Margot Forde – botanist
 Professor Elizabeth Franz – neuroscientist
 Derek Freeman – anthropologist
 Crispin Gardiner – physicist specialising in Quantum Optics
 Nicola Gaston – chemist
 Juliet Gerrard – biochemist and Prime Minister's chief science advisor
 Charles Gifford – teacher and very successful promoter of astronomy
 Sir Peter David Gluckman – medical science
 Janet Grieve – biological oceanographer
 Timothy Haskell – Antarctic physicist
 Robert Cecil Hayes – seismologist
 Ron Heath - physical oceanographer
 Sir James Hector – geologist
 Heather Hendrickson – microbiologist
 Barbara Heslop – immunologist
 Helen Heslop – immunotherapist, hematologist
 Vicki Hyde – skeptic, psychologist
 Harold John Finlay – palaeontologist, malacologist
 Christina Hulbe – Antarctic glaciologists
 Frederick Hutton – naturalist
 Diamond Jenness – anthropologist
 Sir Vaughan Jones – mathematician, awarded Fields Medal
 Sir Neville Jordan – engineer, businessman, philanthropist
 Mike Joy – freshwater ecologist, science communicator
 Roy Kerr – proved a solution to Einstein's equations which modelled a spinning black hole
 Pat Langhorne – Antarctic physicist
Libby Liggins – Marine ecologist
 Alan G MacDiarmid – co-winner of the 2000 Nobel Prize in Chemistry
 Bruce Marshall – taxonomist, malacologist
 Sir Harold Marshall – acoustician
 John Marwick – palaeontologist, geologist
 Ruth Mason – botanist
 Sir Archie McIndoe – pioneer plastic surgeon
 Tracey McIntosh – sociologist
 Don Merton – conservationist
 Brian Molloy – botanist
 Pérrine Moncrieff – ornithologist
 Mary Morgan-Richards – evolutionary biologist
 Tim Naish – glaciologist
 John Morton – biologist, theologian
 Wendy Nelson – marine algae expert
 Frank Newhook – plant pathologist
 Dame Charmian O'Connor – organic chemist
 Stephen Parke – theoretical physicist
 David Penny – biologist
 William Pickering – central figure and pioneer of NASA space exploration
 Winston Ponder – malacologist
 Arthur William Baden Powell – naturalist, malacologist, palaeontologist
 Margaret Reid – physicist specialising in quantum optics
 James Renwick – climate scientist
 Christina Riesselman – paleoceanographer
 Natalie Robinson – polar oceanographer
 Jacqueline Rowarth – agricultural scientist
 Ernest Rutherford, 1st Baron Rutherford of Nelson – scientist and winner of the 1908 Nobel Prize in Chemistry
 Jim Salinger – climate scientist
 Liz Slooten – zoologist
 David Spence – mathematician
 Gerald Stokell – horticulturist, ichthyologist
 Kathryn Stowell – biochemist
 Vida Stout – limnologist
 Mary Sutherland – botanist
 Jeff Tallon – physicist
 Warren Tate – biochemist
 Beatrice Tinsley – astronomer and cosmologist
 Kevin Trenberth – meteorologist and atmospheric scientist
 Ingrid N. Visser – marine biologist known for studying orcas
 Sir Julius von Haast – geologist
 Dan Walls – physicist and pioneer in quantum optics
 Ian Warrington – horticulturalist, administrator
 Robert Webster – discovered the link between human flu and bird flu
 William Henry Webster – malacologist and conchcologist
 Joan Wiffen – paleontologist, discovered first dinosaur fossils in New Zealand
 Siouxsie Wiles – microbiologist
 Maurice Wilkins – shared the 1962 Nobel Prize in Medicine for his part in elucidating the structure of DNA
 Allan Charles Wilson – biochemist; revolutionary evolutionist
 Christine Winterbourn – pathologist
 David Wratt – ex-Chief Climate Scientist, National Institute of Water and Atmospheric Research (NIWA)
 Gillian Wratt – Antarctic researcher, first woman director of the New Zealand Antarctic Programme
 John Stuart Yeates – botanist

Other lists of New Zealand scientists
 Hector Memorial Medal recipients
 Rutherford Medal recipients
 New Zealand Antarctic Medal recipients
 Sciblogs.co.nz
 List of New Zealand women botanists

References

 
New Zealand
Scientists